Blue Jay Creek is a stream in Berrien County, in the U.S. state of Michigan. It is a tributary to the Galien River.

Blue Jay Creek was named for the blue jays often seen there by early settlers.

References

Rivers of Berrien County, Michigan
Rivers of Michigan